There are over 20,000 Grade II* listed buildings in England. This page is a list of these buildings in the City of Westminster.

Buildings

|}

See also
 Grade I listed buildings in the City of Westminster

Notes

External links

Lists of Grade II* listed buildings in London